"Demonheart" is a symphonic power metal song by Italian songwriter Luca Turilli which appeared on his solo album Prophet of the Last Eclipse. It was released as a single shortly after the album's release.

The single featured the full song, as well as an edit of one of the songs from Prophet of the Last Eclipse and an edit of one of the songs from King of the Nordic Twilight, two original songs, and a cover of the Helloween track "I'm Alive".

Track listing
"Demonheart" (5:02)
"Prophet of the Last Eclipse (Edit)" (4:23)
"Rondeau in C Minor" (1:24)
"Black Realms' Majesty" (4:33)
"Kings of the Nordic Twilight (Edit)" (4:56)
"I'm Alive" (3:43)

Charts

References

2002 singles
Luca Turilli songs
2002 songs